Lord Gummer may refer to either of the following Conservative Party life peers:
Peter Gummer, Baron Chadlington
John Gummer (Baron Deben)